Hindley Manufacturing Company is an ISO 9001-2000 certified, wire-hardware manufacturer located in Cumberland, Rhode Island. The company produces a wide range of specially designed wire forms and standard wire hardware parts for number of applications and industries.

Specific products include Bright Wire and Stainless Steel Hardware, Peg Hooks, Turnbuckles, Storage Hooks, Plumbing Specialties, Cotter Pins, Eyebolts, U-bolts, J-bolts, Screw Eyes & a variety of Hook types.

In 1897, the company's founder Walter Hindley, automated the manufacture of cotter pins in a small shop near the Blackstone River north of Providence, RI. The company originally produced only cotter pins and then plumbing supplies. Currently, the company's main focus is on the various wire-hardware products mentioned previously.

In 1956, the company was relocated to its present-day location in Cumberland.

Buildings and structures in Cumberland, Rhode Island
Manufacturing companies based in Rhode Island
American companies established in 1897
1897 establishments in Rhode Island